Each of the 48 states of the United States plus several of its territories and the District of Columbia issued individual passenger license plates for 1933.

Passenger baseplates

Non-passenger plates

See also

Antique vehicle registration
Electronic license plate
Motor vehicle registration
Vehicle license

References

External links

1933 in the United States
1933